Rendolepsis is a film made in Luxembourg in 2003, directed by Marc Barnig and Philippe Schockweiler and produced by Koler Movies Lëtzebuerg (KML). It stars Vivi Giampaolo and Joëlle Kugener as two friends who embark on an adventure to learn more about a mysterious book which one of them finds in her attic.

The film premiered on 19 September or 20 September 2003, at the Kinosch cinema in Esch-sur-Alzette. The dialogue is in Luxembourgish, the national language of Luxembourg..

See also
Cinema of Luxembourg

External links 
 
 KML's page on Rendolepsis
 Worldcinema.lu page on the film
 Ai Caramba page on the film
 Another Ai Caramba page on the film

2003 films
Luxembourgian thriller films
Luxembourgish-language films
2003 fantasy films